The Propionibacteriaceae are a family of Gram-positive bacteria found in dairy products or in the intestinal tracts of animals and living in the pores of humans.

References

Further reading
 

 
Taxa described in 1957